The San Francisco Conservatory of Music (SFCM) is a private music conservatory in San Francisco, California. As of 2021, it had 480 students.

History

The San Francisco Conservatory of Music was founded in 1917 by Ada Clement and Lillian Hodghead as the Ada Clement Piano School. In 1923, the name was changed to the San Francisco Conservatory of Music. In 1956 the Conservatory moved from Sacramento Street to 1201 Ortega Street, the home of a former infant shelter. It resided there for fifty years, before moving to its next location at 50 Oak Street in 2006.

In 2020, the SFCM added the new Bowes Center at 200 Van Ness Avenue (across from Davies Symphony Hall), a 12-story building that includes dorms (eight floors) with acoustic insulation for 400 of its students, 27 rent-controlled apartments for residents of the older building that was replaced by the construction, and some public performing spaces, including a penthouse concert room with views towards the north and west. The Bowes Center's $200 million cost was largely funded by donors, including $46.4 million from the William K. Bowes, Jr. Foundation. The San Francisco Chronicle's architecture critic John King characterized the building's design as "[pushing] against the strict rules of the historic district but [respecting] the air of gravitas. For starters, the building is skinned in translucent glass that conceals insulation and the structural frame — a touch that adds a milky visual depth ..." As of 2021, the Bowes Center was envisaged to fully open to the public in February 2022.

In 2020, SFCM announced a partnership with the talent management company Opus 3 Artists, and in May 2022 it acquired the Dutch classical music label, Pentatone, funded by a private donor. The music website "Classical Voice" described this "combination of a music-education organization with two professional music businesses" as "unusual."

Leaders

 Ada Clement and Lillian Hodghead, 1917–1925
Ernest Bloch, 1925–1930
 Ada Clement and Lillian Hodghead, 1930–1951
 Albert Elkus, 1951–1957
 Robin Laufer, 1957–1966
 Milton Salkind, 1966–1990
 Stephen Brown, 1990–1991
 Milton Salkind (Acting President), 1991–1992
 Colin Murdoch, 1992–2013
 David Stull, 2013–present

Notable faculty

Jeff Anderson (tuba)
Elinor Armer (composition)
Alexander Barantschik (violinist and Concertmaster of the San Francisco Symphony)
Dusan Bogdanovic (composer and guitarist)
Luciano Chessa (composer, music history and literature)
David Conte (composer)
Jacques Desjardins (composer)
Mason Bates (composer)
Patricia Craig (voice)
Eugene Izotov (oboe)
Mark Lawrence (trombone)
Susanne Mentzer (voice)
Garrick Ohlsson (piano)
David Tanenbaum (guitar)
Deborah Voigt (voice)
Indre Viskontas (soprano)

Notable alumni
Léopold Simoneau (tenor)
Isaac Stern (violinist)
Aaron Jay Kernis, Pulitzer Prize winning and Grammy Award-winning composer, member of the Yale School of Music faculty

References

External links

 Official website

 
Music venues in San Francisco
Music schools in San Francisco
Universities and colleges in San Francisco
Educational institutions established in 1917
Schools accredited by the Western Association of Schools and Colleges
American music awards
Classical music awards
Music of the San Francisco Bay Area
Private universities and colleges in California
1917 establishments in California